No. 228 Squadron RAF was a squadron of the Royal Air Force active at various times between 1918 and 1964. It spent the greatest part of its existence flying over water, doing so in First, and Second World Wars and beyond, performing anti-submarine, reconnaissance and air-sea rescue tasks.

History

Formation and the First World War

The squadron formed on 20 August 1918 at Great Yarmouth during the re-organisation of the former RNAS stations of Nos. 324, 325 and 326 Flights. The squadron was initially equipped with both Felixstowe F.2A and Curtiss H.16 aircraft and was involved in anti-submarine patrols. The last patrol was flown on 24 October 1918 and the squadron disbanded on 30 June 1919 at RNAS Killingholme.

Reformation
The squadron reformed on 15 December 1936 at RAF Pembroke Dock, and was initially equipped with a variety of aircraft including Short Singapores, a Supermarine Scapa, a Saro London and a Supermarine Stranraer. However, by September 1938 the squadron was just operating Stranraers. In November 1938 the squadron received its first Short Sunderland, and by April 1939 the squadron was completely re-equipped with Sunderlands.

Second World War
When the Second World War began the squadron was at Alexandria in Egypt. The squadron immediately returned to Pembroke Dock and sent detachments to RAF Invergordon and RAF Sullom Voe. In June 1940 the squadron returned to Egypt following Italy's declaration of war on Britain. In June 1941 the squadron moved to Gambia, West Africa, returning in August 1941 to Pembroke Dock and then RAF Stranraer to be re-equipped. In March 1942 at RAF Oban, the squadron became operational again, moving to RAF Lough Erne in December 1942 and then back to Pembroke Dock in May 1943, where it remained until disbanding on 4 June 1945.

On Liberators
On 1 June 1946 the squadron reformed at RAF St Eval when No. 224Y Squadron was renumbered. The squadron was equipped with Consolidated Liberators GR.6 and GR.8s and performed passenger and freight services with the Liberators to Ireland, Gibraltar, the Azores and Morocco, but also had reconnaissance, air-sea rescue and meteorological tasks. 
It disbanded on 30 September 1946 at RAF St Eval.

On Shackletons
The squadron reformed again on 1 July 1954 at St Eval, equipped with the Avro Shackleton as a maritime reconnaissance unit, moving in November 1956 to RAF St Mawgan and in January 1958 back to St Eval, where is disbanded on 1 April 1959.

On Helicopters
In September 1959 the squadron reformed again via the renumbering of No. 275 Squadron at RAF Leconfield. The squadron was now a helicopter search and rescue unit, flying Bristol Sycamores -passing them on to 118 sqn- and Westland Whirlwinds.

On 28 August 1964 the squadron was disbanded at Leconfield, when it was renumbered to No. 202 Squadron.

Aircraft operated

Squadron airfields

Notes

References
 Bowyer, Michael J.F. and John D.R. Rawlings. Squadron Codes, 1937-56. Cambridge, UK: Patrick Stephens Ltd., 1979. .
 Evans, John. Help from the Heavens: A History of No. 228 Squadron RAF. Pembroke Dock, Pembrokeshire, UK: Paterchurch Publications, 1998. .
 Flintham, Vic and Andrew Thomas. Combat Codes: A full explanation and listing of British, Commonwealth and Allied air force unit codes since 1938. Shrewsbury, Shropshire, UK: Airlife Publishing Ltd., 2003. .
 Halley, James J. The Squadrons of the Royal Air Force & Commonwealth 1918-1988. Tonbridge, Kent, UK: Air Britain (Historians) Ltd., 1988. .
 Jefford, C.G. RAF Squadrons, a Comprehensive Record of the Movement and Equipment of all RAF Squadrons and their Antecedents since 1912. Shrewsbury, Shropshire, UK: Airlife Publishing, 2001. .
 Rawlings, John D.R. Coastal, Support and Special Squadrons of the RAF and their Aircraft. London: Jane's Publishing Company Ltd., 1982. .

External links

 Squadron history on RAF website
 Squadron history at RafWeb

Aircraft squadrons of the Royal Air Force in World War II
228 Squadron
Maritime patrol aircraft units and formations
Rescue aviation units and formations
Military units and formations established in 1918
Military units and formations disestablished in 1964
1917 establishments in England